Turesson is a surname. Notable people with the surname include:

Göte Turesson (1892–1970), Swedish botanist
Tom Turesson (1942–2004), Swedish footballer and manager

Swedish-language surnames